The , or CEMA, is a trade association which represents construction equipment manufacturers in Japan.
The association often responds to inquiries from media and researchers on the state of the manufacturing business environment in Japan.

Founding
The association was formed in a time when the industry was in a massive price war. The future members of the association realized that if the war went on no one would make a profit and the companies would hurt each other. Once the industry formed its group, every company felt secure again.

References 

Construction equipment manufacturers of Japan
Trade associations based in Japan